The Tompkinsville National Cemetery was located on the corner of 2nd & Emberton Streets in Tompkinsville, Monroe County, Kentucky.  The cemetery is known today as The Old Soldiers Cemetery.  The old Civil War cemetery was marked with a Kentucky Historical Society Roadside Marker on July 9, 2012.

The information on the historical marker reads as follows:

References

External links
 Kentucky Historical Society to Dedicate Historical Marker Honoring Tompkinsville National Cemetery
 

Cemeteries in Kentucky